Rexona is an Australian deodorant and antiperspirant brand, owned by British conglomerate Unilever.  
   
While marketed under the Rexona name in most countries, it is known as Rexena in Japan and South Korea, Sure in the United Kingdom, Ireland and India, Shield in South Africa, and Degree in the United States and Canada.

The Rexona aerosol spray deodorant range are manufactured in Australia. All the other Rexona deodorant types (including roll-ons, etc) are now all manufactured in the Philippines.

History
Rexona was developed in 1908 by Australian Samuel Fuller Sheffer and his wife, Alice. Unilever took over the Australian company in 1989 and eventually integrated it into its global personal care line-up of brands. The products are available in varying forms including as aerosols, pumps, roll-ons, sticks and creams. In 2015 the brand launched a new range of fragrances with a new canister design, at the same time changing the formula.

Internationally

India
In India, it was launched in 1947 as a rival to Hamam, then a Tata product, then Hindustan Unilever. As Hindustan Unilever already uses Rexona as a soap brand, the Sure brand was used instead for deodorants, as it is in the United Kingdom and Ireland.

United States
Degree is a brand of antiperspirant for men and women that is manufactured by Unilever. It comes in stick, gel, and spray forms. The stick form often comes with slogans pressed into the deodorant itself by the protective seal. For example, the "Cool Rush" variety comes with the slogan "Take The Risk". The Degree brand name was created by Helene Curtis, which Unilever acquired in 1996.

Other Sure brands 
In the United States, Sure is an antiperspirant brand created by Procter & Gamble in 1972, marketed to both men and women. Innovative Brands, LLC, a portfolio company of Jahm Najafi Companies, acquired the brand from Procter & Gamble in September 2006, after P&G had acquired Gillette. The brand's ownership transferred to Helen of Troy Limited, which acquired the brand from Innovative Brands in March 2010. Since being acquired by Helen of Troy in the United States, Sure is now marketed exclusively as a woman's antiperspirant. Although the brand already exists in the United States, Sure exists as a brand in the UK, Ireland and India, as the localized branding of Rexona, which has no connection to the US Sure branding.

Marketing 

The Rexona and Sure brands were sponsors for the Williams Formula 1 team. The brands had previously sponsored the Lotus F1 team before from the 2014 F1 season onwards.

Rexona also developed a flash platformer called "Power Pamplona" which involves a bull runner racing across various countries.

In football, Rexona, Rexena and Sure brands are the sponsors of the English football clubs such as Chelsea, Wolverhampton Wanderers, Southampton and Manchester City for the Japanese and Korean, France, Germany, Russia and Ukraine, UK and Ireland, Belgium, Slovenia, Poland, Italy, Croatia, Czech Republic and Slovakia, Indian, Switzerland, Australia and New Zealand, Austria, Netherlands, African and Southeast Asian markets.

Rexona and Sure brands also sponsor the Spanish top-flight football league, La Liga for the Latin American, African and Southeast Asian markets.

References

External links
 

Hygiene
Unilever brands
Helen of Troy Limited
Personal care brands
Products introduced in 1908